Hoge is an unincorporated community in Leavenworth County, Kansas, United States.  It is part of the Kansas City metropolitan area.

History
A post office was established as Hoge Station in 1868 by Joseph Hoge, for whom the community was named. The post office closed in 1901.

References

Further reading

External links
 Leavenworth County maps: Current, Historic, KDOT

Unincorporated communities in Leavenworth County, Kansas
Unincorporated communities in Kansas